Thomas Bachler (born 3 June 1965 in Schwaz) is an Austrian bobsledder who competed during the 1990s. Competing in three Winter Olympics, he earned his best finish of sixth in the four-man event at Lillehammer in 1994.

References
 1992 bobsleigh two-man results
 1992 bobsleigh four-man results
 1994 bobsleigh four-man results
 1998 bobsleigh four-man results

1965 births
Austrian male bobsledders
Olympic bobsledders of Austria
Bobsledders at the 1992 Winter Olympics
Bobsledders at the 1994 Winter Olympics
Bobsledders at the 1998 Winter Olympics
Living people
People from Schwaz
Sportspeople from Tyrol (state)